Monica Scheel (born 9 March 1967) is a Brazilian sailor. She competed in the women's 470 event at the 1992 Summer Olympics.

References

External links
 

1967 births
Living people
Brazilian female sailors (sport)
Olympic sailors of Brazil
Sailors at the 1992 Summer Olympics – 470
Sportspeople from São Paulo